South Carolina Highway 135 (SC 135) is a  state highway in the U.S. state of South Carolina. The highway travels through mostly rural areas of Pickens County.

Route description
SC 135 begins at an intersection with U.S. Route 178 (US 178, Moorefield Memorial Highway) southeast of Liberty within Pickens County. It travels to the northeast and crosses Carmel Creek before entering Easley. The highway has a brief concurrency with SC 8 (Pelzer Highway). A very short distance after SC 8 splits off onto South 5th Street, the highway has an interchange with U.S. Route 123 (US 123; Calhoun Memorial Highway). It passes a U.S. Post Office and Gettys Middle School before intersecting SC 93 (Main Street). It immediately crosses over railroad tracks and turns right onto NE Main Street. One block later, it turns left onto North A Street. It crosses over Georges Creek and Mud Dog Branch before leaving the city limits of the city. SC 135 travels in a fairly northerly direction and crosses over Burdine Creek. It has an intersection with SC 183 (Farrs Bridge Road) and SC 186 (Earls Bridge Road). It begins traveling to the north-northwest and crosses over Shoal Creek. It curves to the northwest and crosses over Carpenter Creek. South of Pumpkintown, it crosses over Adams Creek and meets its northern terminus, another intersection with SC 8 (Pumpkintown Highway).

Major intersections

See also

References

External links

SC 135 South Carolina Hwy Index

135
Transportation in Pickens County, South Carolina